The Direct Democrats (DD) is a Swedish non-affiliated neutral political party, based on the principles of liquid democracy, a form of direct democracy.

The Direct Democrats believe that the electorate should be able to directly influence their DD representatives by voting on political issues and policy proposals through the Internet. The party received 0.08% of the vote in the 2018 general election, making it the fourth largest party with no representation in the Riksdag.

History 

The Direct Democrats party was approved by the Swedish Election Authority April 4, 2014. This new party was a merger of three direct democracy parties; Demoex, Aktiv Demokrati, and Äkta Demokrati. DD's short-term goal was to introduce the idea of direct digital democracy (DDD) in Sweden by running for election in 2014. The party received 0.02% of the vote in that year's election.

Digital democracy application 

The Direct Democrats party voted in the end of 2016 to use a system for digital democracy being developed by the Swedish non-profit, iGov.Direct® Foundation to be released ahead of the Swedish 2018 September election.

Results in the general election of Sweden

References

Further reading

External links
 

Direct democracy parties
Political parties established in 2014
E-democracy
2014 establishments in Sweden
Minor political parties in Sweden